Séan Francis Gibbons (31 May 1883 – 19 April 1952) was an Irish politician who sat as Cumann na nGaedheal Teachta Dála (TD) in the 1920s and as a Fianna Fáil TD in the 1930s. He later became a Senator, and was Cathaoirleach (chairperson) of the Seanad for five years.

Gibbons was elected to Dáil Éireann on his first attempt, as a Cumann na nGaedheal candidate in the Carlow–Kilkenny constituency at the 1923 general election. However, he was not an active participant in proceedings because his health was poor, requiring him to leave the country at one point.

He left Cumann na nGaedhael to join the National Party in March 1924, led by Joseph McGrath, in the aftermath of the Army Mutiny. He and eight other National Party TDs resigned their seats in the 4th Dáil on 30 October 1924, only 14 months after his election. The by-election was held on 11 March 1925 and won by Cumann na nGaedheal's Thomas Bolger.

Gibbons joined Fianna Fáil and stood for them as a candidate in Carlow–Kilkenny at the 1932 general election, winning one of his party's fifteen new seats in the 7th Dáil. He was returned at the 1933 general election, but after the constituency was divided under the Electoral (Revision of Constituencies) Act 1935, he lost his seat at the 1937 general election in the new Kilkenny constituency.

He then stood as a Fianna Fáil candidate for election to Seanad Éireann on the Agricultural Panel, winning a seat in the 2nd Seanad and becoming Cathaoirleach. He remained as Cathoirleach in the 3rd Seanad, holding the office until 1944, when he was re-elected to the 4th Seanad. He did not sit in the 5th Seanad but was re-elected by the Agricultural Panel to the 6th Seanad, sitting from 1948 to 1951.

He died on 19 April 1952, aged 68. Five years later, his nephew Jim Gibbons was elected as a Fianna Fáil TD in the restored Carlow–Kilkenny constituency, where Jim's son Martin Gibbons was a Progressive Democrat TD from 1987 to 1989. Another of Jim's sons, Jim Gibbons Jnr was a Progressive Democrat Senator.

See also
Families in the Oireachtas

References

1883 births
1952 deaths
Cumann na nGaedheal TDs
Fianna Fáil TDs
Cathaoirligh of Seanad Éireann
Members of the 4th Dáil
Members of the 7th Dáil
Members of the 8th Dáil
Members of the 2nd Seanad
Members of the 3rd Seanad
Members of the 4th Seanad
Members of the 6th Seanad
Fianna Fáil senators